Bang! is the ninth studio album by English hard rock band Thunder. Recorded at Walton Castle in Clevedon, North Somerset, it was produced by the band's lead guitarist Luke Morley. The album was released in the UK by STC Recordings on 3 November 2008, and later in Europe by Frontiers Records and in Japan by Victor Entertainment. The album was released alongside the extended play The Joy of Six, containing six previously unreleased tracks.

Bang! debuted at number 62 on the UK Albums Chart and number 2 on the UK Rock & Metal Albums Chart. No singles were released from the album, although "On the Radio" was issued as a promotional release. Following the album's release, Thunder completed a short concert tour in the UK before announcing that they were due to disband for a second time in August 2009, with the final run of shows dubbed "20 Years & Out: The Farewell Tour".

Background
Prior to working on their ninth album, Thunder recorded and released two extended plays (EPs) of new tracks and live recordings – Six of One... and ...Half a Dozen of the Other – which were released on 8 October 2007 and 7 April 2008, respectively. A third EP, The Joy of Six, was issued on the same day as Bang! and came in a box designed to house both previous EPs. Sessions for Bang! began in February 2008, with the band working at Walton Castle in Clevedon, North Somerset. Ben Matthews recalls that "Recording at the castle was a real experience. Taking our Pro Tools rig and a big box of microphones, we turned one castle turret into a control room and another turret into a recording studio. Linking them with a long cable, I had to climb up and run it along the top of the castle walls." Matthews likened the production process to that of Deep Purple's 1972 album Machine Head, which was recorded at the Grand Hotel in Montreux, Switzerland using the Rolling Stones Mobile Studio.

Bang! was released in the UK by STC Recordings on 3 November 2008, following a launch party on 27 October at the Hard Rock Cafe in Manchester featuring an acoustic set from the band. The album was later released in Europe by Frontiers Records and in Japan by Victor Entertainment, the latter of which featured two bonus tracks. It debuted at number 62 on the UK Albums Chart, number 2 on the UK Rock & Metal Albums Chart, and number 73 on the Scottish Albums Chart. Outside of the UK, it reached number 99 on the Oricon Albums Chart in Japan. The album's opening track "On the Radio" was released as the only promotional single from the album. Bang! was promoted on a short eight-date tour of the UK from 21 to 30 November 2008, before the band announced in January 2009 that they were due to break up after a farewell tour running until August.

Track listing

Personnel
Danny Bowes – vocals
Luke Morley – guitar, backing vocals, production
Ben Matthews – guitar, keyboards, engineering, mixing
Chris Childs – bass
Gary "Harry" James – drums, percussion

Chart positions

References

Bibliography

External links
Bang! on Thunder's official website

2008 albums
Thunder (band) albums
Frontiers Records albums
Victor Entertainment albums